KPSM is a radio station airing a Contemporary Christian music format licensed to Brownwood, Texas, broadcasting on 99.3 MHz FM. The station is owned by BLM of Brownwood, Inc.

References

External links

Contemporary Christian radio stations in the United States
PSM